Diospyros oppositifolia is a species of tree in the ebony family, Ebenaceae. It is endemic to Sri Lanka.

Distribution
The tree is limited to southwestern Sri Lanka. It has been noted in local forest reserves, such as Sinharaja Biosphere Reserve.

Habitat and ecology
The tree grows in lowland rainforest habitat.

Threats
This is an endangered species threatened by slash-and-burn and logging practices.

References

External resources

Herbarium specimen

oppositifolia
Endemic flora of Sri Lanka
Trees of Sri Lanka
Endangered flora of Asia